In numerical analysis and linear algebra, lower–upper (LU) decomposition or factorization factors a matrix as the product of a lower triangular matrix and an upper triangular matrix (see matrix decomposition). The product sometimes includes a permutation matrix as well. LU decomposition can be viewed as the matrix form of Gaussian elimination. Computers usually solve square systems of linear equations using LU decomposition, and it is also a key step when inverting a matrix or computing the determinant of a matrix. The LU decomposition was introduced by the Polish astronomer Tadeusz Banachiewicz in 1938. To quote: "It appears that Gauss and Doolittle applied the method
[of elimination] only to symmetric equations. More recent authors, for example, Aitken, Banachiewicz, Dwyer, and Crout … have emphasized the use of the method, or variations of it, in connection with non-symmetric problems … Banachiewicz … saw the point … that the basic problem is really one of matrix factorization, or “decomposition” as he called it."
It's also referred to as LR decomposition (factors into left and right triangular matrices).

Definitions 

Let A be a square matrix. An LU factorization refers to the factorization of A, with proper row and/or column orderings or permutations, into two factors – a lower triangular matrix L and an upper triangular matrix U:

In the lower triangular matrix all elements above the diagonal are zero, in the upper triangular matrix, all the elements below the diagonal are zero. For example, for a 3 × 3 matrix A, its LU decomposition looks like this:

Without a proper ordering or permutations in the matrix, the factorization may fail to materialize. For example, it is easy to verify (by expanding the matrix multiplication) that . This is impossible if A is nonsingular (invertible). This is a procedural problem. It can be removed by simply reordering the rows of A so that the first element of the permuted matrix is nonzero. The same problem in subsequent factorization steps can be removed the same way; see the basic procedure below.

LU factorization with partial pivoting 

It turns out that a proper permutation in rows (or columns) is sufficient for LU factorization. LU factorization with partial pivoting (LUP) refers often to LU factorization with row permutations only:

where L and U are again lower and upper triangular matrices, and P is a permutation matrix, which, when left-multiplied to A, reorders the rows of A. It turns out that all square matrices can be factorized in this form, and the factorization is numerically stable in practice. This makes LUP decomposition a useful technique in practice.

LU factorization with full pivoting 

An LU factorization with full pivoting involves both row and column permutations:

where L, U and P are defined as before, and Q is a permutation matrix that reorders the columns of A.

Lower-diagonal-upper (LDU) decomposition

A Lower-diagonal-upper (LDU) decomposition is a decomposition of the form

where D is a diagonal matrix, and L and U are unitriangular matrices, meaning that all the entries on the diagonals of L and U are one.

Rectangular matrices 
Above we required that A be a square matrix, but these decompositions can all be generalized to rectangular matrices as well. In that case, L and D are square matrices both of which have the same number of rows as A, and U has exactly the same dimensions as A. Upper triangular should be interpreted as having only zero entries below the main diagonal, which starts at the upper left corner. Similarly, the more precise term for U is that it is the "row echelon form" of the matrix A.

Example 

We factor the following 2-by-2 matrix:
 

One way to find the LU decomposition of this simple matrix would be to simply solve the linear equations by inspection. Expanding the matrix multiplication gives

This system of equations is underdetermined. In this case any two non-zero elements of L and U matrices are parameters of the solution and can be set arbitrarily to any non-zero value. Therefore, to find the unique LU decomposition, it is necessary to put some restriction on L and U matrices. For example, we can conveniently require the lower triangular matrix L to be a unit triangular matrix (i.e. set all the entries of its main diagonal to ones). Then the system of equations has the following solution:

Substituting these values into the LU decomposition above yields

Existence and uniqueness

Square matrices 

Any square matrix  admits LUP and PLU factorizations. If  is invertible, then it admits an LU (or LDU) factorization if and only if all its leading principal minors are nonzero (for example 
does not admit an LU or LDU factorization). If  is a singular matrix of rank , then it admits an LU factorization if the first  leading principal minors are nonzero, although the converse is not true.

If a square, invertible matrix has an LDU (factorization with all diagonal entries of L and U equal to 1), then the factorization is unique.

In general, any square matrix  could have one of the following:
 a unique LU factorization (as mentioned above);
 infinitely many LU factorizations if two or more of any first (n−1) columns are linearly dependent or any of the first (n−1) columns are 0;
 no LU factorization if the first (n−1) columns are non-zero and linearly independent and at least one leading principal minor is zero.

Symmetric positive-definite matrices 

If A is a symmetric (or Hermitian, if A is complex) positive-definite matrix, we can arrange matters so that U is the conjugate transpose of L. That is, we can write A as
 

This decomposition is called the Cholesky decomposition. The Cholesky decomposition always exists and is unique — provided the matrix is positive definite. Furthermore, computing the Cholesky decomposition is more efficient and numerically more stable than computing some other LU decompositions.

General matrices 

For a (not necessarily invertible) matrix over any field, the exact necessary and sufficient conditions under which it has an LU factorization are known. The conditions are expressed in terms of the ranks of certain submatrices. The Gaussian elimination algorithm for obtaining LU decomposition has also been extended to this most general case.

Algorithms

Closed formula 

Computation of the determinants is computationally expensive, so this explicit formula is not used in practice.

Using Gaussian elimination 
The following algorithm is essentially a modified form of Gaussian elimination. Computing an LU decomposition using this algorithm requires  floating-point operations, ignoring lower-order terms. Partial pivoting adds only a quadratic term; this is not the case for full pivoting.

Procedure 
Given an N × N matrix , define  as the matrix  in which the necessary rows have been swapped to meet the desired conditions (such as partial pivoting) for the 1st column. The parenthetical superscript (e.g.) of the matrix  is the version of the matrix. The matrix  is the  matrix in which the elements below the main diagonal have already been eliminated to 0 through Gaussian elimination for the first  columns, and the necessary rows have been swapped to meet the desired conditions for the  column.

For this operation,

We perform these row operations to eliminate the elements  to zero.  Once we have subtracted these rows, we may swap rows to provide the desired conditions for the  column. We may swap rows here to perform partial pivoting, or because the element  on the main diagonal is zero (and therefore cannot be used to implement Gaussian elimination).

We define the final permutation matrix  as the identity matrix which has all the same rows swapped in the same order as the  matrix.

Note, we can denote  as  because the N-th column of  has no conditions for which rows need to be swapped.

Example 
If we are given the matrixwe will chose to implement partial pivoting and thus swap the first and second row so that our matrix  and the first iteration of our  matrix respectively becomeOnce we have swapped the rows, we can eliminate the elements below the main diagonal on the first column by performing such that,Once these rows have been subtracted, we have derived from  the matrix Because we are implementing partial pivoting, we swap the second and third rows of our derived matrix and the current version of our  matrix respectively to obtainNow, we eliminate the elements below the main diagonal on the second column by performing  such that . Because no non-zero elements exist below the main diagonal in our current iteration of  after this row subtraction, this row subtraction derives our final  matrix (denoted as ) and final  matrix:Now we can obtain our final  matrix:Now these matrices have a relation such that .

Relations when no rows are swapped 
If we did not swap rows at all during this process, we can perform the row operations simultaneously for each column  by setting  where  is the N × N identity matrix with its n-th column replaced by the transposed vector  In other words, the lower triangular matrix

Performing all the row operations for the first  columns using the  formula is equivalent to finding the decomposition

Denote  so that .

We know that  has the following formula.

If there are two lower triangular matrices with 1s in the main diagonal, and neither have a non-zero item below the main diagonal in the same column as the other, then we can include all non-zero items at their same location in the product of the two matrices. For example:

Using the matrix , we obtain 

It is clear that in order for this algorithm to work, one needs to have  at each step (see the definition of ). If this assumption fails at some point, one needs to interchange n-th row with another row below it before continuing. This is why an LU decomposition in general looks like .

LU Crout decomposition 
Note that the decomposition obtained through this procedure is a Doolittle decomposition: the main diagonal of L is composed solely of 1s. If one would proceed by removing elements above the main diagonal by adding multiples of the columns (instead of removing elements below the diagonal by adding multiples of the rows), we would obtain a Crout decomposition, where the main diagonal of U is of 1s.

Through recursion 

Cormen et al. describe a recursive algorithm for LUP decomposition.

Given a matrix A, let P1 be a permutation matrix such that

 ,

where , if there is a nonzero entry in the first column of A; or take P1 as the identity matrix otherwise. Now let , if ; or  otherwise. We have

 

Now we can recursively find an LUP decomposition . Let . Therefore

 

which is an LUP decomposition of A.

Randomized algorithm 
It is possible to find a low rank approximation to an LU decomposition using a randomized algorithm.

Theoretical complexity 
If two matrices of order n can be multiplied in time M(n), where M(n) ≥ na for some a > 2, then an LU decomposition can be computed in time O(M(n)). This means, for example, that an O(n2.376) algorithm exists based on the Coppersmith–Winograd algorithm.

Sparse-matrix decomposition 
Special algorithms have been developed for factorizing large sparse matrices. These algorithms attempt to find sparse factors L and U. Ideally, the cost of computation is determined by the number of nonzero entries, rather than by the size of the matrix.

These algorithms use the freedom to exchange rows and columns to minimize fill-in (entries that change from an initial zero to a non-zero value during the execution of an algorithm).

General treatment of orderings that minimize fill-in can be addressed using graph theory.

Applications

Solving linear equations 
Given a system of linear equations in matrix form

we want to solve the equation for x, given A and b. Suppose we have already obtained the LUP decomposition of A such that , so .

In this case the solution is done in two logical steps:
 First, we solve the equation  for y.
 Second, we solve the equation  for x.

In both cases we are dealing with triangular matrices (L and U), which can be solved directly by forward and backward substitution without using the Gaussian elimination process (however we do need this process or equivalent to compute the LU decomposition itself).

The above procedure can be repeatedly applied to solve the equation multiple times for different b. In this case it is faster (and more convenient) to do an LU decomposition of the matrix A once and then solve the triangular matrices for the different b, rather than using Gaussian elimination each time. The matrices L and U could be thought to have "encoded" the Gaussian elimination process.

The cost of solving a system of linear equations is approximately  floating-point operations if the matrix  has size . This makes it twice as fast as algorithms based on QR decomposition, which costs about  floating-point operations when Householder reflections are used. For this reason, LU decomposition is usually preferred.

Inverting a matrix 
When solving systems of equations, b is usually treated as a vector with a length equal to the height of matrix A. In matrix inversion however, instead of vector b, we have matrix B, where B is an n-by-p matrix, so that we are trying to find a matrix X (also a n-by-p matrix):

We can use the same algorithm presented earlier to solve for each column of matrix X. Now suppose that B is the identity matrix of size n. It would follow that the result X must be the inverse of A.

Computing the determinant 
Given the LUP decomposition  of a square matrix A, the determinant of A can be computed straightforwardly as

The second equation follows from the fact that the determinant of a triangular matrix is simply the product of its diagonal entries, and that the determinant of a permutation matrix is equal to (−1)S where S is the number of row exchanges in the decomposition.

In the case of LU decomposition with full pivoting,  also equals the right-hand side of the above equation, if we let S be the total number of row and column exchanges.

The same method readily applies to LU decomposition by setting P equal to the identity matrix.

Code examples

C code example 
/* INPUT: A - array of pointers to rows of a square matrix having dimension N
 *        Tol - small tolerance number to detect failure when the matrix is near degenerate
 * OUTPUT: Matrix A is changed, it contains a copy of both matrices L-E and U as A=(L-E)+U such that P*A=L*U.
 *        The permutation matrix is not stored as a matrix, but in an integer vector P of size N+1 
 *        containing column indexes where the permutation matrix has "1". The last element P[N]=S+N, 
 *        where S is the number of row exchanges needed for determinant computation, det(P)=(-1)^S    
 */
int LUPDecompose(double **A, int N, double Tol, int *P) {

    int i, j, k, imax; 
    double maxA, *ptr, absA;

    for (i = 0; i <= N; i++)
        P[i] = i; //Unit permutation matrix, P[N] initialized with N

    for (i = 0; i < N; i++) {
        maxA = 0.0;
        imax = i;

        for (k = i; k < N; k++)
            if ((absA = fabs(A[k][i])) > maxA) { 
                maxA = absA;
                imax = k;
            }

        if (maxA < Tol) return 0; //failure, matrix is degenerate

        if (imax != i) {
            //pivoting P
            j = P[i];
            P[i] = P[imax];
            P[imax] = j;

            //pivoting rows of A
            ptr = A[i];
            A[i] = A[imax];
            A[imax] = ptr;

            //counting pivots starting from N (for determinant)
            P[N]++;
        }

        for (j = i + 1; j < N; j++) {
            A[j][i] /= A[i][i];

            for (k = i + 1; k < N; k++)
                A[j][k] -= A[j][i] * A[i][k];
        }
    }

    return 1;  //decomposition done 
}

/* INPUT: A,P filled in LUPDecompose; b - rhs vector; N - dimension
 * OUTPUT: x - solution vector of A*x=b
 */
void LUPSolve(double **A, int *P, double *b, int N, double *x) {

    for (int i = 0; i < N; i++) {
        x[i] = b[P[i]];

        for (int k = 0; k < i; k++)
            x[i] -= A[i][k] * x[k];
    }

    for (int i = N - 1; i >= 0; i--) {
        for (int k = i + 1; k < N; k++)
            x[i] -= A[i][k] * x[k];

        x[i] /= A[i][i];
    }
}

/* INPUT: A,P filled in LUPDecompose; N - dimension
 * OUTPUT: IA is the inverse of the initial matrix
 */
void LUPInvert(double **A, int *P, int N, double **IA) {
  
    for (int j = 0; j < N; j++) {
        for (int i = 0; i < N; i++) {
            IA[i][j] = P[i] == j ? 1.0 : 0.0;

            for (int k = 0; k < i; k++)
                IA[i][j] -= A[i][k] * IA[k][j];
        }

        for (int i = N - 1; i >= 0; i--) {
            for (int k = i + 1; k < N; k++)
                IA[i][j] -= A[i][k] * IA[k][j];

            IA[i][j] /= A[i][i];
        }
    }
}

/* INPUT: A,P filled in LUPDecompose; N - dimension. 
 * OUTPUT: Function returns the determinant of the initial matrix
 */
double LUPDeterminant(double **A, int *P, int N) {

    double det = A[0][0];

    for (int i = 1; i < N; i++)
        det *= A[i][i];

    return (P[N] - N) % 2 == 0 ? det : -det;
}

C# code example 
public class SystemOfLinearEquations
{
    public double[] SolveUsingLU(double[,] matrix, double[] rightPart, int n)
    {
        // decomposition of matrix
        double[,] lu = new double[n, n];
        double sum = 0;
        for (int i = 0; i < n; i++)
        {
            for (int j = i; j < n; j++)
            {
                sum = 0;
                for (int k = 0; k < i; k++)
                    sum += lu[i, k] * lu[k, j];
                lu[i, j] = matrix[i, j] - sum;
            }
            for (int j = i + 1; j < n; j++)
            {
                sum = 0;
                for (int k = 0; k < i; k++)
                    sum += lu[j, k] * lu[k, i];
                lu[j, i] = (1 / lu[i, i]) * (matrix[j, i] - sum);
            }
        }

        // lu = L+U-I
        // find solution of Ly = b
        double[] y = new double[n];
        for (int i = 0; i < n; i++)
        {
            sum = 0;
            for (int k = 0; k < i; k++)
                sum += lu[i, k] * y[k];
            y[i] = rightPart[i] - sum;
        }
        // find solution of Ux = y
        double[] x = new double[n];
        for (int i = n - 1; i >= 0; i--)
        {
            sum = 0;
            for (int k = i + 1; k < n; k++)
                sum += lu[i, k] * x[k];
            x[i] = (1 / lu[i, i]) * (y[i] - sum);
        }
        return x;
    }
}

MATLAB code example 
function LU = LUDecompDoolittle(A)
    n = length(A);
    LU = A;
    % decomposition of matrix, Doolittle’s Method
    for i = 1:1:n
        for j = 1:(i - 1)
            LU(i,j) = (LU(i,j) - LU(i,1:(j - 1))*LU(1:(j - 1),j)) / LU(j,j);
        end
        j = i:n;
        LU(i,j) = LU(i,j) - LU(i,1:(i - 1))*LU(1:(i - 1),j);
    end
    %LU = L+U-I
end

function x = SolveLinearSystem(LU, B)
    n = length(LU);
    y = zeros(size(B));
    % find solution of Ly = B
    for i = 1:n
        y(i,:) = B(i,:) - LU(i,1:i)*y(1:i,:);
    end
    % find solution of Ux = y
    x = zeros(size(B));
    for i = n:(-1):1
        x(i,:) = (y(i,:) - LU(i,(i + 1):n)*x((i + 1):n,:))/LU(i, i);
    end    
end

A = [ 4 3 3; 6 3 3; 3 4 3 ]
LU = LUDecompDoolittle(A)
B = [ 1 2 3; 4 5 6; 7 8 9; 10 11 12 ]'
x = SolveLinearSystem(LU, B)
A * x

See also 
Block LU decomposition
Bruhat decomposition
Cholesky decomposition
Crout matrix decomposition
Incomplete LU factorization
LU Reduction
Matrix decomposition
QR decomposition

Notes

References 

 .
 .
 .
 . See Section 3.5. N − 1
 .
 .
 .
 .
 .

External links 
References
 LU decomposition on MathWorld.
 LU decomposition on Math-Linux.
 LU decomposition at Holistic Numerical Methods Institute
 LU matrix factorization. MATLAB reference.

Computer code
 LAPACK is a collection of FORTRAN subroutines for solving dense linear algebra problems
 ALGLIB includes a partial port of the LAPACK to C++, C#, Delphi, etc.
 C++ code, Prof. J. Loomis, University of Dayton
 C code, Mathematics Source Library
 Rust code
 LU in X10

Online resources
 WebApp descriptively solving systems of linear equations with LU Decomposition
 Matrix Calculator with steps, including LU decomposition,
 LU Decomposition Tool, uni-bonn.de
 LU Decomposition by Ed Pegg, Jr., The Wolfram Demonstrations Project, 2007.

Matrix decompositions
Numerical linear algebra
Articles with example C code
Articles with example C Sharp code

de:Gaußsches Eliminationsverfahren#LR-Zerlegung